Van Landeghem is a Dutch surname. Notable people with the name include:

 Alfred Van Landeghem, Belgian rower
 Chantal Van Landeghem (born 1994), Canadian freestyle and butterfly swimmer
 Jan Van Landeghem (born 1954), Belgian composer
 Ria Van Landeghem (born 1957), Belgian long-distance runner

Dutch-language surnames
Surnames of Dutch origin